Malus tschonoskii (common names Chonosuki crab and pillar apple) is a species of flowering plant in the family Rosaceae, native to Japan.

The specific epithet tschonoskii refers to the 19th century Japanese botanist Sugawa Tschonoski.

Description
Malus tschonoskii is a strong-growing deciduous tree, it has a distinctive columnar habit and is particularly noted for its autumn colouring, when the glossy mid-green leaves turn to brilliant shades of yellow, orange, purple and scarlet. Single white flowers, tinged pink, appear in May and are followed by rounded red-flushed yellow-green crabapples.

Habitat
The species grows well in many soil types, doing best in moist, well-drained soil.

Uses
It is cultivated as an ornamental tree, for planting in gardens.

References

tschonoskii
Crabapples
Endemic flora of Japan
Garden plants of Asia
Ornamental trees